The 2014 Minnesota Secretary of State election was held on November 4, 2014, to elect the Minnesota Secretary of State.

Incumbent Democratic–Farmer–Labor Secretary of State Mark Ritchie did not run for re-election to a third term in office. Primary elections were held on August 12, 2014. The Democratic–Farmer–Labor Party (DFL) nominated State Representative Steve Simon, the Republican Party nominated State Representative Dan Severson and the Independence Party nominated business process analyst Bob Helland.

Simon narrowly defeated Severson in the general election.

Democratic–Farmer–Labor primary
The Democratic–Farmer–Labor endorsement was made on May 31, 2014. State Representative Steve Simon was endorsed by acclamation over fellow State Representative Debra Hilstrom, who conceded before the results of the first ballot were announced and withdrew from the race.

Candidates

Declared
Dick Franson, perennial candidate
Gregg Iverson
Steve Simon, state representative (party endorsed)

Withdrew
Rachel Bohman, former Hennepin County elections manager
Debra Hilstrom, state representative
Jeremy Kalin, former state representative

Declined

Roger Reinert, state senator
Mark Ritchie, incumbent secretary of state
Ryan Winkler, state representative

Results

Republican primary
The Republican endorsement was made on May 30, 2014. Former state representative Dan Severson, the Republican nominee for secretary of state in 2010, was endorsed after one ballot when former state senator John Howe withdrew his name from consideration.

Candidates

Declared
Dan Severson, former state representative, nominee for secretary of state in 2010 and candidate for the U.S. Senate in 2012

Withdrew
John Howe, former state senator
Dennis Nguyen, investment executive

Declined
Ted Daley, former state senator
Pat Garofalo, state representative
Kent Kaiser, professor at Northwestern College
Mary Kiffmeyer, state senator and former secretary of State
Joyce Peppin, state representative

Results

Independence primary
The Independence Party endorsement was made on May 17, 2014. Bob Helland won the endorsement.

Candidates
Bob Helland, business process analyst (party endorsed)
David Singleton

Results

General election

Candidates
Steve Simon (DFL), state representative
Dan Severson (Republican), former state representative, nominee for secretary of state in 2010 and candidate for the U.S. Senate in 2012
Bob Helland (Independence), business process analyst
Bob Odden (Libertarian)

Polling

Results

See also
2014 Minnesota elections

References

External links
Elections & Voting - Minnesota Secretary of State

2014 Minnesota elections
Minnesota Secretary of State elections
November 2014 events in the United States
Minnesota